The Crime of Ovide Plouffe, also known as Murder in the Family in its television run, is a Canadian film and television miniseries from Quebec. The project consisted of two parts: a two-hour theatrical film directed by Denys Arcand which was released to theatres in 1984, and a six-hour television miniseries which aired in 1986, with four hours directed by Gilles Carle leading into the Arcand film as the final two hours.

The series was an adaptation of Roger Lemelin's 1982 novel, Le crime d'Ovide Plouffe, a sequel to his influential 1948 novel Les Plouffe. The original novel had been adapted by Carle as the 1981 film The Plouffe Family, and many of the same actors from the 1981 film reprised their roles in The Crime. The cast included Gabriel Arcand, Anne Létourneau, Donald Pilon, Serge Dupire, Dominique Michel, Rémy Girard, Julien Poulin, and Pierre Curzi.

The theatrical film depicted the criminal trial of Ovide Plouffe after he is falsely accused of murdering his wife Rita (Létourneau), while the television-only episodes told the story leading up to Rita's death.

The series aired in French on Télévision de Radio-Canada, and in English on CBC Television, in 1986. The French airing retained the film's title Le Crime d'Ovide Plouffe, while the English airing of the series was retitled from The Crime of Ovide Plouffe to Murder in the Family.

Awards
The film garnered six Genie Award nominations at the 6th Genie Awards in 1985:
Best Actor: Gabriel Arcand
Best Supporting Actor: Donald Pilon
Best Art Direction/Production Design: Jocelyn Joly
Best Cinematography: François Protat
Best Costume Design: Nicole Pelletier
Best Editing: Monique Fortier
Gabriel Arcand won the award for Best Actor.

References

External links
 

1984 films
1984 drama films
1980s Canadian television miniseries
Canadian crime drama films
Films directed by Denys Arcand
Films directed by Gilles Carle
CBC Television original films
Ici Radio-Canada Télé original programming
1986 Canadian television series debuts
1986 Canadian television series endings
Films produced by John Kemeny
Films produced by Jacques Bobet
French-language Canadian films
Canadian drama television films
1980s Canadian films